Events from the year 1856 in China.

Incumbents 
 Xianfeng Emperor (6th year)

Viceroys
 Viceroy of Zhili —  Guiliang

Events 

 Nian Rebellion
 several Nian bands formed an alliance led by Zhang Lexing, organizing themselves into a loose confederation of five armies
 Second Opium War begins
 Authorities in Canton order attacks on Thirteen Factories, which are subsequently destroyed in a fire
 Merchant ship Arrow seized by Qing authorities 
 Battle of Canton (1856)
 Capture of the French Folly Fort
 Battle of the Bogue (1856)
 November — Battle of the Barrier Forts
 Taiping Rebellion
 Battle of Jiangnan (1856), Qing forces twice fail to re-take Nanjing
 Tianjing incident, internal conflict within the Taiping Heavenly Kingdom
 Miao Rebellion (1854–73)
 Panthay Rebellion
 a massacre of at least 4,000 Muslims organized by a Qing Manchu official responsible for suppressing the revolt in the provincial capital of Kunming sparked a province-wide multi-ethnic insurgency.
 Red Turban Rebellion (1854–1856) ends

Deaths 
 Yang Xiuqing in Tianjing
 Jirhangga, Qing commander in Battle of Jiangnan (1860)
 Xiang Rong, Qing commander in Battle of Jiangnan (1860)
 Hu Jiumei, Chinese rebel in the Taiping Rebellion

References